Danny Lui (7 January 1957 – 1 July 2012) was a Hong Kong entrepreneur and venture capitalist. He graduated from Imperial College, London with a degree in Computer Science before returning to Hong Kong and winning the Hong Kong Young Industrialist Award in 1992. He is best-known for co-founding Lenovo. He maintained working relationships with governments in China and Hong Kong.  He also had a network of venture capital connections on both sides of the Pacific.

Life
Lui was born in January 1957 in Hong Kong to a relatively poor working-class family and for the duration of his early life, he began to develop an interest and passion for computers.

In the late 1970s he graduated from Imperial College, London with a Bachelor's Degree in Computer Science. Following his graduation, he worked for a London-based firm building software applications for other companies. In 1982, Denny returned to Hong Kong and started his first business, Daw Computer Systems, Ltd. Seven years later, he teamed up with China Academy of Sciences’ Institute of Computing and co-founded the legend group, known as Lenovo in Hong Kong, which in December 2004 acquired the PC Division of IBM for $1.7 billion.

In 1994, he led Legend through a successful IPO on the Hong Kong Stock Exchange and the company today is currently the largest PC manufacturer in China.

Three years later, Lui founded APTG Ventures, his first venture fund focusing on high-tech investments in Silicon Valley and China.  The fund has since been received with relative success, having identified star companies with strong exit records and profitable returns through IPOs as well as mergers and acquisitions.

In 2000. Lui established his second fund, Authosis which focused on both IT and semiconductor industry and invested mainly in early-stage software and fabless IC design companies targeting the internet, e-commerce, wireless and mobile solutions, consumer electronics, computing and communication markets.

Five years later in 2005, Lui co-founded a new venture fund, Startup Capital Ventures, with John Dean, former Chairman and CEO of Silicon Valley Bank, and several other partners.  The fund emphasizes on investing early-stage companies in Silicon Valley and China.

References

External links
Danny Lui - Startup Capital Ventures

Hong Kong businesspeople
1957 births
2012 deaths
Alumni of the Department of Computing, Imperial College London